Calytrix gracilis is a species of plant in the myrtle family Myrtaceae that is endemic to Western Australia.

It usually blooms between August and October producing violet-blue star-shaped flowers.

Found on sandy ridges, on breakaway and among sandy outcrops in the Mid West and Wheatbelt regions of Western Australia between Geraldton and the Swan Coastal Plain where it grows on sand or sand-loam soils over laterite.
 
The species was first formally described by the botanist George Bentham in 1867 in the article Orders XLVIII. Myrtaceae- LXII. Compositae. in the work Flora Australiensis. The only synonym is Calycothrix gracilis as described by Ferdinand von Mueller in 1882 in the work Systematic Census of Australian Plants.

References

gracilis
Endemic flora of Western Australia
Rosids of Western Australia
Plants described in 1867
Taxa named by George Bentham